Frank Rodriguez, professionally known as Frank Ski (born May 9, 1964), is an American DJ, journalist, philanthropist, radio personality, and public forums host. He also was a Baltimore club and house music artist who recorded as solo, as well as a part of the group 2 Hyped Brothers & a Dog in the 1990s. From 1998 to 2012, and again from 2017 to January 2019, he was the host of the Frank and Wanda Morning Show alongside co-host Wanda Smith on the Atlanta urban contemporary radio station WVEE. He now hosts another morning show called The Morning Culture alongside Jade Novah and J.R. Jackson.

Biography

Career highlights
In 2002, Reverend Jesse Jackson awarded Ski the title of "Journalist of the Year" by the Rainbow Push Coalition.

After Hurricane Katrina hit New Orleans in 2005, Ski spearheaded a fundraising movement to help the victims. He raised $500,000 to support the causes of Hosea Williams Feed the Hungry and Homeless and Metro Atlanta Respite & Development Services.

Ski hosts the International Civil Rights Walk of Fame. The Walk is a partnership between the Trumpet Awards Foundation and the National Park Service. It was created in 2004 to give recognition to civil rights leaders who promote justice and equality.

In 2009, he finished second (to Neal Boortz) in an unscientific ajc.com poll for the most obnoxious Atlanta radio personality. Radio & TV Talk with Rodney Ho held a poll on whether V-103 should keep Frank Ski (during the time of his contract re-negotiations), which resulted in a 59%  outcome of "No". He has recently been criticized for his support of Bishop Eddie Long during his sex scandal, despite attending another Atlanta church.

Ski had a lengthy career as a radio personality and record producer in the Baltimore radio market. He was also one of the pioneers of Baltimore club music at V-103-Baltimore (1988-1996) and at WERQ Baltimore (1996-1998), before moving to Atlanta in 1998. His 1993 track "Whores in this House" gave rise to a local genre that was later sampled by and referenced in hip-hop albums, including "WAP" by Cardi B & Megan Thee Stallion, which peaked and debuted at number one on the Billboard Hot 100. He also recorded songs with "Miss Tony," a club-track vocalist who performed as a gay man at hip-hop parties. The first song Ski and Miss Tony recorded together, "Tony's Bitch Track," helped to popularize gay culture and the complexities that exist between gender binaries.

Awards and recognition
 Rainbow Push Coalition, Reverend Jesse Jackson (2002)
 Georgia March of Dimes, Achievement in Radio Award (A.I.R.)
 National Urban League, Atlanta Chapter; Distinguished Community Service Award (2007)
 Ludacris Foundation, Community Service Award, 2008
 11 Alive Community Service Award (2009)
 Mentioned by Uganda Musician Ritah Kigozi in her song "Twandibadewo" (3:23-3:25)

Frank Ski Kids
The Frank Ski Kids Foundation is an Atlanta area organization created by Ski in 2000. Its mission statement is "exposing kids to their future through science, technology, athletics, and the arts".

The foundation hosts a yearly Youth Bowl football competition. It gives young people the opportunity to travel abroad on excursions that support the foundation's science, technology and art programs and organizes a yearly trip to the NASA Space and Rocket Center in Huntsville, Alabama. There have also been excursions to the Galapagos Islands (2007), the Amazon rainforest (2008) and an international artistic enrichment trip to Florence, Italy (2009).

Studio albums
 Ya Rollin' Doo Doo (with 2 Hyped Brothers & a Dog) (1991)
 Frank Ski Club Trax (1992)

Singles
 "Doo Doo Brown" (with 2 Hyped Brothers & a Dog) (1991)
 "Tony's Bitch Track" (1992)
 "Whores In This House" (1992)

References

External links
 USA Today, Frank Ski: 2009 CSA Recipient (video)
 TV 11 Alive (video)
 Atlanta Woman Magazine, Fan Male Honorees 2009
 Frank Ski Biography, The HistoryMakers
Frank Ski Kids videos
 Frank Ski Kid Foundation Go to the Amazons! (2008)
 Frank Ski Youth Foundation, Science Excursion (2007)
 Interview with Program Founder Frank Ski, The History Makers; Media Makers, February 26, 2008

African-American journalists
Journalists from New York City
African-American radio personalities
American DJs
Philanthropists from New York (state)
American radio personalities
People from Harlem
1964 births
Living people
21st-century African-American people
20th-century African-American people